Skokovi is a village in the municipality of Cazin, Bosnia and Herzegovina.

The village was home to Fikret Abdić's political outfit, the Muslim Democratic Party.

Demographics 
According to the 2013 census, its population was 703.

References

Populated places in Cazin